The term Samsui women (mandarin for 'red headscarf') broadly refers to a group of Chinese female immigrants who came to Malaya and Singapore between the 1920s and 1940s in search of construction and industrial jobs. These women hailed mostly from the Sanshui district of modern-day Guangdong, a province in southern China. Other areas of origin include Shunde and Dongguan, Fujian and Chao’an, although labourers from these regions were relatively few in number. Their hard work contributed to the development of the Straits Settlements, both as colonies and later as the new nations of Singapore and Malaysia. Samsui women did manual labour similar to coolies but were considered to be more independent.

Background information 
China faced the problem of overpopulation in the 19th century and 20th century. Between 1650 and 1800 during the Qing era, China's population nearly doubled. However, there were insufficient farmlands to support the rapid population growth. Provinces of China such as Fujian and Guangdong were especially affected. Many of them lived in mountainous regions where there was limited land for growing crops. As a result, many Chinese in Southern China suffered from starvation. Hence, many Chinese immigrants came to Singapore to seek job opportunities to make more money for better lives.

In Singapore, there were more workers needed to load and unload goods, repair ships, clear jungles for settlements, construct roads and buildings, and provide service for the workers, hence, many immigrants came to Singapore because of the job opportunities, higher wages, and better living conditions.

Clothing

Headdress 
In Chinese, these women are referred to as Hong Tou Jin, which means "red bandana", because of the red cloths they wrapped around their heads. It was this headdress that would become a trademark feature. The red cloths around their heads also kept their hair clean while they work as dust and debris can dirty their hair, since they washed their hair only once a month. The headdress was a square piece of cloth starched stiff and folded into a square-shaped hat. The colour red was used because it caught attention easily, thus reducing the chances of accidents occurring at the construction site. Besides its shading properties, the headdress was useful in storing items such as cigarettes, matches and money. Those who wore the blue version of the headgear typically hailed from Sun Yap, China, but could also be utilised during a period of mourning, after which the women reverted to their original red headgear.

Blouse/ Samfoo 
They usually dressed in dark-blue or black samfu (also spelt samfoo), which comprised a set of blouse and trousers. The dark colours ensured that the clothes would not stain easily. The footwear they typically wore were pieces of rubber cut out from used tyres, which they made into sandals by adding straps.

Jobs
Coming to Singapore as cheap labourers between the 1920s and 1940s, it was hard to find jobs in Singapore, so the Samsui women worked mainly in the construction industry and other industries that required hard labour. They also worked as domestic servants. Samsui women were the traditional source of manpower supply in the construction industry, in order to support their families in their homelands.

Samsui women earned 50 to 60 cents per day. This was barely enough for their food and rental, and still have to return the money borrowed from the agency to come to find work in Singapore. As a result, they gave up the prospect of marriage and children and lived very simply to save money to support their families who they might never see again after they left home. A majority of women would work for about a year to pay off their debts.They often shared accommodation and ate simple food, such as cooked rice, some bean cheese and a bit of pickled or fresh vegetables. Samsui women dug soil and carried earth, debris and building materials in buckets hung from shoulder poles. Despite the long working hours, they only had short lunch breaks, during which they were needed to gather wood to bring home as fuel for cooking. Their contributions to housing construction and as well as labour at hawker centres have been invaluable to Singapore's early development.

Social interactions
Upon arriving in Singapore, Samsui women would make their way to the Chinatown neighbourhood located between South Bridge Road and New Bridge Road, where many of their fellow samsui migrants stayed. They lived in rooms above shophouses that lined streets such as Upper Chin Chew, Upper Nankin and Eu Tong Sen. A room was further subdivided into cubicles, with at least four women sharing one single room. Rent in the 1930s to 1940s ranged from 80 cents to $1.20 a month.

Samsui women also remained in touch with their relatives back home in China, communicating with them frequently through letters. As Samsui women hailed mostly from the poorer parts of China, they were mostly illiterate, and hired professional letter writers to write the letters for them.

Current status
Organisations exist to raise awareness of these women's achievements and contributions to Singapore's development, and their current state. Some of these organisations also strive to provide free travel for the women back to China to visit their relatives before they die. One such organisation was the Sam Shui Wai Kuan Association that took care of the needs of Samsui women.

As of 2014, there was only two remaining Samsui women, Ng Moey Chye, who was born in Singapore to mainland Chinese parents and Woo Yum Sum. In 2020, Woo died.

Portrayal in media
The travails of the Samsui women were portrayed in Samsui Women, a television drama series produced by Singapore Broadcasting Corporation in 1986, which has widely been considered as one of the best dramas Singapore has produced over the years. There was also a theatrical play by The Finger Players, called "Samsui Women: One Brick at a Time", held at the Esplanade – Theatres on the Bay.

During the 2018 National Day Parade, a short film depicted the real-life stories of five Singaporeans, including that of a former samsui woman.

References

Construction trades workers
Singaporean women
Industry in Singapore
Immigration to Singapore
History of Singapore
Women in craft
Foshan
History of Guangdong
Chinese emigrants to Singapore